Nguyễn Thị Hòa (born 27 July 1990) is a Vietnamese women's international footballer who plays as a forward for Hà Nội I. She is a member of the Vietnam women's national football team. She was part of the team at the 2014 AFC Women's Asian Cup.

International goals

References

External links 
 

1990 births
Living people
Women's association football forwards
Vietnamese women's footballers
Vietnam women's international footballers
Asian Games competitors for Vietnam
Footballers at the 2010 Asian Games
Southeast Asian Games silver medalists for Vietnam
Southeast Asian Games medalists in football
Competitors at the 2013 Southeast Asian Games
21st-century Vietnamese women